Båsmoen is a small village located in the municipality of Rana in Nordland county, Norway. Båsmoen has grown together with its neighboring village to the east, Ytteren. Both villages are sometimes considered a northern suburb of the town of Mo i Rana.

References

Villages in Nordland
Rana, Norway